Esporte Clube 14 de Julho, commonly known as 14 de Julho, is a Brazilian football club based in Santana do Livramento, Rio Grande do Sul state.

The club was founded on 14 July 1902, in the Santana do Livramento-Rivera border, which separates Brazil and Uruguay. In the first decades after the club's foundation, they played several games and competitions in Uruguay.

During his youth the World Cup participant of 1930 Moderato Wisintainer played for the club.

Stadium
Esporte Clube 14 de Julho play their home games at Estádio João Martins. The stadium has a maximum capacity of 5,000 people.

References

Association football clubs established in 1902
Football clubs in Rio Grande do Sul
1902 establishments in Brazil
Santana do Livramento